Bukreyeva is a rural locality (a village) in Ust-Zulinskoye Rural Settlement, Yurlinsky District, Perm Krai, Russia. The population was 80 as of 2010. There are 3 streets.

Geography 
Bukreyeva is located 19 km northeast of Yurla (the district's administrative centre) by road. Ust-Zula is the nearest rural locality.

References 

Rural localities in Yurlinsky District